Wilbur Reed LePage was an American professor and department chair of electrical and computer engineering at Syracuse University. He was the author of numerous textbooks, including Complex Variables and the Laplace Transform for Engineers and Applied APL Programming. He was a noted authority on the APL programming language.

During World War II, he helped develop the proximity fuze, used to detonate explosives when they are close enough to damage their target.

In 1953, LePage testified before Senator Joseph McCarthy, denying having any Communist affiliations during his time at the Griffiss Air Force Base radar research center.

LePage graduated from Cornell University with a degree in electrical engineering in 1933, earned a masters from the University of Rochester, and returned to Cornell to earn a PhD in 1941. He was a member of the Quill and Dagger society. He also held membership in the American Institute of Electrical Engineers, Sigma Xi, Tau Beta Pi, Eta Kappa Nu, and Phi Kappa Phi.

References

Cornell University alumni
Syracuse University faculty
1996 deaths
University of Rochester alumni